National Route 7 is a national highway in South Korea. It connects Busan with Goseong in Gangwon Province. Before the division of the Korean Peninsula, the highway ran until Onsong, North Hamgyong Province, in present-day North Korea.

This highway will be one of the Asia Highway Route 6 until all segments of Donghae Expressway opens to traffic. Its name in Pohang~Goseong is Donghae-daero (Korean: 동해대로).

History 
 31 November 1979: Samcheok~Pohang segment opens to traffic. (2 Lanes)
 29 December 2010: All segment of Route 7 widen 4 lanes.

Characteristics 
In de jure, the highway passes through South & North Hamgyong Province, which are de facto controlled by North Korea. By this highway, it throughs Hwasong concentration camp.

Main stopovers

South Korea part
 Busan
 Jung District - Dong District - Busanjin District - Yeonje District - Dongnae District - Geumjeong District
 South Gyeongsang Province
 Yangsan
 Busan
 Gijang County
 South Gyeongsang Province
 Yangsan
 Ulsan
 Ulju County - Nam District - Jung District - Buk District
 North Gyeongsang Province
 Gyeongju - Pohang - Yeongdeok County - Uljin County
 Gangwon Province
 Samcheok - Donghae - Gangneung - Yangyang County - Sokcho - Goseong County

North Korea part
 Kangwon Province
 Kosong County - Tongchon County
 South Hamgyong Province
 Wonsan - Kowon County - Kumya County - Hamhung - Hungnam - Pukchong County - Tanchon
 North Hamgyong Province
 Kimchaek - Kilju County - Chongjin - Rason - Kyonghung County - Kyongwon County - Onsong County

Major intersections

 (■): Motorway
IS: Intersection, IC: Interchange

Busan·Yangsan City

Ulsan

North Gyeongsang Province 

  Motorway section
 Uljin County Hujeong IS ~ Gopo Tunnel (Donghae-daero)

Gangwon Province 

  Motorway section
 Samcheok Wolcheon Tunnel ~ Obun IS (Donghae-daero)

References

7
Roads in Busan
Roads in South Gyeongsang
Roads in Ulsan
Roads in North Gyeongsang
Roads in Gangwon